Michael Jerrold Smolen (November 18, 1940 – November 25, 1992) was an American bridge player from Chicago.

He was the inventor of the popular Smolen convention, an extension of Stayman, which is employed when the partner of a 1NT opener shows his/her 5+ card major.

Smolen, who lived in Alamo, California during his career, died in Los Angeles in 1992.

Bridge accomplishments

Awards

 Fishbein Trophy (1) 1982

Wins

 North American Bridge Championships (5)
 Rockwell Mixed Pairs (1) 1979 
 Jacoby Open Swiss Teams (1) 1982 
 Keohane North American Swiss Teams (1) 1978 
 Mitchell Board-a-Match Teams (1) 1976 
 Reisinger (1) 1984

Runners-up

 North American Bridge Championships
 Wernher Open Pairs (1) 1990 
 Jacoby Open Swiss Teams (1) 1990 
 Mitchell Board-a-Match Teams (1) 1974

Notes

1940 births
1992 deaths
People from Chicago
American contract bridge players
People from Alamo, California